Vytautas Andriuškevičius (born 8 October 1990), commonly known as Vytas, is a retired Lithuanian footballer who played as a left back. He is now an assistant coach for the Portland Thorns of the National Women's Soccer League.

Playing career

Club 
Andriuškevičius began his professional career in 2007 with FBK Kaunas in Lithuania. From 2007 to 2008, he was loaned to FBK Kaunas's second team to gain experience as a starter. However, he was unable to earn meaningful playing time, and soon signed with Lechia Gdańsk of the Polish Ekstraklasa.

On 3 April 2013, he joined Djurgårdens IF on a one-year contract with an option for an additional three years.

In 2014, Andriuškevičius signed with SC Cambuur of the Dutch Eredivisie. On 13 May 2016, he left the team after it was relegated from Eredivisie to Eerste Divisie.

On 14 July 2016, he signed with the Portland Timbers of Major League Soccer (MLS) and played for two years there.

On 7 August 2018, it was announced that he had transferred within MLS to D.C. United in exchange for $50,000 of Targeted Allocation Money. He suffered a hip flexor injury during training which sidelined him for the rest of the season. He was released by D.C. United at the end of the 2018 season after not making a single appearance.

In 2019, he played five games for Lithuanian team FK Sūduva, which won the A Lyga that season. On July 8, 2019, he transferred to Kazakh team FC Tobol and played 12 games there. For the 2020 season, he transferred to another Kazakh team, FC Kyzylzhar, and played 10 games.

He announced his retirement in April 2021.

International
Andriuškevičius was part of the Lithuania national football team. On 10 September 2019 he scored his only international goal, against Portugal in a 1–5 loss.

Coaching career 
After retiring from playing, Andriuškevičius moved back to Portland and began coaching youth sports. On May 11, 2022 he became an assistant coach for Portland Thorns FC, the women's team in the same organization as the Timbers.

Career statistics

Club

National team

International goals
Scores and results list Lithuania's goal tally first.

References

External links
 
 

1990 births
Living people
Allsvenskan players
Association football defenders
Djurgårdens IF Fotboll players
Ekstraklasa players
Eredivisie players
Expatriate footballers in Poland
Expatriate footballers in the Netherlands
Expatriate soccer players in the United States
FBK Kaunas footballers
Lechia Gdańsk players
Lechia Gdańsk II players
Lithuanian expatriate footballers
Lithuanian expatriate sportspeople in the United States
Lithuanian expatriate sportspeople in Poland
Lithuanian footballers
Lithuania international footballers
Major League Soccer players
Portland Timbers players
Portland Timbers 2 players
SC Cambuur players
Sportspeople from Alytus
USL Championship players
D.C. United players